The 16th Cavalry Division (16-ya Kavaleriiskaya Diviziya) was a cavalry formation of the Russian Imperial Army, formed from the 2nd and 3rd Separate Cavalry Brigades.

Organization
1st Cavalry Brigade
17th Chernigov Hussar Regiment 
18th Nizhyn Hussar Regiment
2nd Cavalry Brigade
16th Novoarkhangelsk Uhlan Regiment
17th Novomirgorod Uhlan Regiment

Commanders
02.12.1914 - 06.04.1915 - Lieutenant-General Abram Dragomirov
26.04.1915 - after 03.01.1917 - Lieutenant-General Nikolai Volodchenko
07.04.1917 — 27.08.1917 - Major-General Dmitry Gurko
27.08.1917 — 12.1917 - Major-General Alexander Onoprienko

References

Cavalry divisions of the Russian Empire
Military units and formations disestablished in 1918